Matheiu Koffi M'Broh (11 October 1949 – 26 February 2012) was an Ivorian sprint canoer who competed in the early 1970s. He was eliminated in the repechages of the C-2 1000 m event at the 1972 Summer Olympics in Munich.

External links
Mathieu Koffi M'Broh's profile at Sports Reference.com
Mathieu Koffi M'Broh's obituary 

1949 births
2012 deaths
Canoeists at the 1972 Summer Olympics
Ivorian male canoeists
Olympic canoeists of Ivory Coast